Baker Peak, at  above sea level is the fifth-highest peak in the Smoky Mountains of the U.S. state of Idaho. It is the 407th-highest peak in Idaho.

References 

Mountains of Idaho
Mountains of Blaine County, Idaho
Mountains of Camas County, Idaho
Sawtooth National Forest